Cheriton may refer to


Places

England

Cheriton, Hampshire, a village and parish near Winchester
The Battle of Cheriton, a battle in the English Civil War
Cheriton, Kent, a one-time village, now a part of the urban area of Folkestone
Cheriton Halt railway station closed in 1947
Cheriton Hill, part of the Folkestone Downs
Cheriton Road, a football stadium that is the home ground of Folkestone Invicta
Cheriton Bishop, a village on the northern borders of Dartmoor National Park
Cheriton Fitzpaine, a village in Devon
North Cheriton, a small village in South Somerset

Wales
Cheriton, Swansea, a village in the county of Swansea
RAF Carew Cheriton, a World War II Royal Air Force airfield near Carew, Pembrokeshire

United States
Cheriton, Virginia, a town in Northampton County

People
David Cheriton, a Computer Science professor and billionaire
David R. Cheriton School of Computer Science, at the University of Waterloo
Odo of Cheriton (died 1247), a preacher and fabulist from Kent
Shirley Cheriton (born 1955), a British actress and performer